The 2005 Spengler Cup was held in Davos, Switzerland, from December 26 to December 31, 2005. All matches were played at Davos' home arena Eisstadion Davos.

Tournament Round-Robin results

Results

Final

External links
Spengler Cup Official Site

2005–06
2005–06 in Swiss ice hockey
2005–06 in Czech ice hockey
2005–06 in Canadian ice hockey
2005–06 in German ice hockey
2005–06 in Russian ice hockey
December 2005 sports events in Europe